Bethel Regional Airport  is a public airport located two miles (3 km) northwest of the central business district of Bethel, a town in Oxford County, Maine, United States. It is owned by the Town of Bethel.

The airport is currently not served by any commercial airline, though on-demand service is available through local charter operators. A free shuttle runs between the town of Bethel and Sunday River ski resort, stopping at the airport on-demand and for occasional scheduled stops.

Facilities and aircraft 

For the 12-month period ending August 26, 2006, the airport had 4,520 aircraft operations, an average of 12 per day: 99.6% general aviation and 0.4% military. There are 13 aircraft based at this airport: 77% single-engine, 15% ultralight and 8% multi-engine.

References

External links 
Bethel Regional Airport (site down)
Bethel Regional Airport page at town website (returns a 404 Error)
Information for pilots at clearancewiki.com

Airports in Oxford County, Maine
Buildings and structures in Bethel, Maine